The 1985 Cal State Fullerton Titans football team represented California State University, Fullerton as a member of the Pacific Coast Athletic Association (PCAA) during the 1985 NCAA Division I-A football season. Led by sixth-year head coach Gene Murphy, Cal State Fullerton compiled an overall record of 6–5 with a mark of 5–2 in conference play, placing second in the PCAA. The Titans played their home games at Santa Ana Stadium in Santa Ana, California.

Schedule

Team players in the NFL
The following Cal State Fullerton Titans were selected in the 1986 NFL Draft.

The following finished their college career in 1985, were not drafted, but played in the NFL.

References

Cal State Fullerton
Cal State Fullerton Titans football seasons
Cal State Fullerton Titans football